United Nations Security Council resolution 560, adopted unanimously on 12 March 1985, after recalling resolutions 473 (1980), 554 (1984) and 556 (1984), the council condemned the continuing repression of anti-apartheid activities in South Africa, noting that the repression would undermine the possibility of a peaceful solution.

The council also expressed its deep concern at charges of high treason on officials from the United Democratic Front and other organisations against apartheid, forced removals from Crossroads and killing of demonstrators. It also noted the denationalisation and dispossession of over 3.5 million indigenous African people and conflict arising from the bantustan policy.

The resolution called upon the "Pretoria regime" to release all political prisoners, including Nelson Mandela, urged the withdrawal of treason charges, and commended the "massive united resistance" of the people of South Africa.

See also
 Internal resistance to South African apartheid
 List of United Nations Security Council Resolutions 501 to 600 (1982–1987)
 South Africa under apartheid

References
Text of the Resolution at undocs.org

External links
 

 0560
1985 in South Africa
 0560
March 1985 events